Nali is an Austronesian language spoken on Manus Island, Papua New Guinea. The Okro dialect is distinct.

References

External links 
 A word list in Nali is archived with Kaipuelohone

Manus languages
Languages of Manus Province